Corallocoris is a genus of bugs, in the infraorder Leptopodomorpha.  Species have been recorded from SE Asia, Japan, Australia and Oceania; this is one of only two genera in the family Omaniidae (sometimes called "intertidal dwarf bugs") and previously some species were placed in Omania.

Species
The Global Biodiversity Information Facility lists:
 Corallocoris aldabrae Cobben, 1987
 Corallocoris marksae (Woodward, 1958)
 Corallocoris nauruensis (Herring & Chapman, 1967)
 Corallocoris satoi (Miyamoto, 1963)
 Corallocoris xishaensis Luo, Wang & Chen, 2022

References

External Links

Leptopodomorpha
Heteroptera genera
Hemiptera of Asia
Hemiptera of Australia